K. Paramalai is an Indian politician and former Member of the Legislative Assembly of Tamil Nadu. He was elected to the Tamil Nadu legislative assembly as an Independent candidate from Manamadurai constituency in 1980 election, as an Indian National Congress candidate in 1984 election and as a Tamil Maanila Congress (Moopanar) candidate in 2001 election.

References 

Indian National Congress politicians from Tamil Nadu
Living people
Year of birth missing (living people)
Tamil Nadu MLAs 1985–1989